Max Futcher is an Australian television presenter and journalist.

He currently co-anchors the Brisbane edition of Seven News with Sharyn Ghidella each weeknight after being chosen to replace Bill McDonald in March 2018.   Prior to joining Seven in 2014, Futcher had worked as a 10 News First reporter and relief newsreader for Network Ten, and as a WIN News reporter for WIN Television.

In 2006, Futcher won the United Nations Peace Media Award for his reporting in East Timor, and in 2016, won a Queensland Clarion Award (with camera operator Mark Michalek) for best television news report for their coverage of the Bali Nine executions.

Futcher is married with two children.

References 

Australian journalists
Year of birth missing (living people)
Living people